Neil Morton (born 21 December 1968) is a former footballer who played as a winger in the Football League for Crewe Alexandra Chester City, and Wigan Athletic.

He now lives in Cumbria with his family and works in a school as a school mentor.

References

External links
 

Chester City F.C. players
1968 births
Living people
People from Congleton
English footballers
Association football midfielders
English Football League players
Northwich Victoria F.C. players
Crewe Alexandra F.C. players
Wigan Athletic F.C. players
Altrincham F.C. players
Barrow A.F.C. players
Morecambe F.C. players
Lancaster City F.C. players
Sportspeople from Cheshire